Hazeldean may refer to:

Hazeldean, Edmonton, Alberta, Canada
Hazeldean, New Brunswick, Canada
Hazeldean, Queensland, Australia
Katimavik-Hazeldean, Ottawa, Canada

See also 
 Hazell Dean, British pop singer
 Jock O'Hazeldean, ballad